The 2009 World Table Tennis Championships mixed doubles was the 50th edition of the mixed doubles championship.

Li Ping and Cao Zhen defeated Zhang Jike and Mu Zi in the final.

Seeds

  Ko Lai Chak /  Tie Ya Na (quarterfinals)
  Joo Sae-hyuk /  Park Mi-young (second round)
  Gao Ning /  Feng Tianwei (fourth round)
  Oh Sang-eun /  Dang Ye-seo (fourth round)
  Tang Peng /  Jiang Huajun (fourth round)
  Hao Shuai /  Chang Chenchen (semifinals)
  Xu Xin /  Fan Ying (quarterfinals)
  Leung Chu Yan /  Lin Ling (fourth round)
  Yang Zi /  Wang Yuegu (fourth round)
  Jun Mizutani /  Sayaka Hirano (fourth round)
  Cheung Yuk /  Lau Sui Fei (third round)
  Chuang Chih-yuan /  Huang Yi-hua (second round)
  Christian Süß /  Elke Schall (quarterfinals)
  Jiang Tianyi /  Zhang Rui (third round)
  Zhang Chao /  Yao Yan (semifinals)
  Adrian Crișan /  Daniela Dodean (second round)
  Xu Hui /  Peng Luyang (third round)
  Kim Jung-hoon /  Lee Eun-hee (second round)
  Patrick Baum /  Wu Jiaduo (second round)
  Li Ping /  Cao Zhen (champions)
  Robert Gardos /  Li Qiangbing (third round)
  Qiu Yike /  Li Xiaodan (third round)
  János Jakab /  Krisztina Tóth (third round)
  Yang Min /  Wenling Tan Monfardini (second round)
  Kenta Matsudaira /  Ai Fukuhara (second round)
  Bastian Steger /  Zhenqi Barthel (third round)
  Zhang Jike /  Mu Zi (final)
  Christophe Legoût /  Carole Grundisch (fourth round)
  Andrei Filimon /  Elizabeta Samara (third round)
  Petr Korbel /  Renáta Štrbíková (third round)
  Mihai Bobocica /  Nikoleta Stefanova (second round)
  Wang Zengyi /  Natalia Partyka (second round)

Final Rounds

Early Rounds

Section 1

Section 2

Section 3

Section 4

Section 5

Section 6

Section 7

Section 8

See also
List of World Table Tennis Championships medalists

References

- Mixed Doubles, 2009 World Table Tennis Championships